Todd J. Greenwald is an American television producer and writer. He is the creator and executive producer of the Emmy Award-winning Wizards of Waverly Place. Greenwald has also served as a producer and writer for Hannah Montana, California Dreams and City Guys.

Education
Greenwald graduated from Emerson College in 1991.

Filmography
Wizards of Warna Walk (2019) (creator, writer, executive producer)
Wizards of Waverly Place (2007–2012) (creator, writer, executive producer)
Hannah Montana (2006-2007) (writer, executive producer)
D.O.T.S. (2004) (TV pilot) (writer, executive producer)
Family Affair (2002) (writer)
According to Jim (2001–2002) (writer)
City Guys (1999–2001) (writer, executive producer)
Life with Roger (1996) (writer)
Hang Time (1995) (supervising producer)
Saved by the Bell: The New Class (1993–1995) (writer)
California Dreams (1992) (producer)

References

External links

American television producers
American television writers
American male television writers
Showrunners
Emerson College alumni
Living people
Year of birth missing (living people)